Miss Transqueen India is an Indian beauty pageant for transgender people across India. Reena Rai, who identifies as cisgender, is the founder and chairperson of the organization. The winner of the pageant will represent India at Miss International Queen. Navya Singh is the Brand Ambassador of Miss Transqueen India.

The reigning Miss Transqueen India is Shaine Soni (crowned 19 December 2020).

Formerly, Nithu R S from Bangalore wore the crown.

History
The founder began trying to bring her project into the limelight in November 2016 but struggled due to lack of sponsorship. The first ever Miss Transqueen India was held at Gurugram, New Delhi where 16 contestants, selected from among 1500 transgender people across 10 states, competed for the crown.

Format
After auditions, contestants compete in several rounds including evening gown, swimsuit, traditional wear, and question-answer.

Titleholders

Representatives to International Pageants 
The following trans queens have represented India in the major international beauty pageants for transgender women, Miss International Queen in Thailand.

Miss International Queen 
Color key

References

Beauty pageants in India
2017 establishments in India
Indian awards
Transgender in Asia